Sylvania is a city in Lucas County, Ohio, United States. The population was 19,011 at the 2020 census. Sylvania is a suburb of Toledo, and encompassed by Sylvania Township. Its northern border is the southern border of the state of Michigan.

The name "Sylvania" is borrowed from the Latin sylvan or sylva, meaning "forest land", owing to the dense forests that once made up the region, part of the Great Black Swamp.

History

General David White is considered the founder of Sylvania as the first pioneer settler and town supervisor, originally from Palmyra, New York. In 1832, White was given the title of General (possibly after services rendered during the War of 1812), which allowed him to explore the western Lake Erie region. In realizing the potential of some available land to the north of Maumee, Ohio, a notable port city at the time, he acquired a title to the land and built a log cabin at what would eventually be the corner of Summit and Monroe streets near downtown Sylvania.

Prior to White's acquisition, the land was a part of Port Lawrence Township, Monroe County, Michigan. The relationship between White and Wilson did not last, and when the boundary dispute that lead to the largely bloodless Toledo War began in 1834, they began splitting the lands they had purchased, platting their own towns. That year, White established the first area school in Whiteford, and platted the township there one year later in 1835. Wilson presented the original plat for Sylvania in June 1836, with the town of Whiteford directly adjacent.

Throughout the 1830s and 1840s, rail transportation saw significant expansion throughout the Great Lakes region. In 1833, the Erie and Kalamazoo Railroad was chartered as part of the Lake Shore and Michigan Southern Railway, running from former Port Lawrence, Michigan (now Toledo, Ohio), to the mouth of the Kalamazoo River at Lake Michigan. Trains were at first pulled by horse until the first steam locomotive was installed in 1837. Sylvania built its own railroad depot along the Erie-Kalamazoo Railroad in 1858. While the depot is no longer in operation, the original station building exists as an exhibit in the Sylvania Historical Village, still next to the railroad which remains in use.

Sylvania was incorporated in 1867. A post office called Sylvania has been in operation since 1859.

Geography

The city is built on large shale deposits, which over hundreds of years have been mined in quarries to make concrete, cement and other stone products. Silica shale from the region is renowned among paleontologists for its high-quality fossils from the early Devonian period.

Notable landmarks 

 The Lathrop House, built in 1853 by minister Lucian Lathrop and wife Larissa, was used by abolitionists as a stop on the Underground Railroad. Slaves trying to escape to freedom in the north were given food and shelter, in a secret room behind an oven door. The house is recognized by the National Trust for Historic Preservation as a building of significant historical and cultural importance. The building was originally located on Main St, just south of downtown Sylvania, but after a 2002 land dispute, it was moved to Harroun Park across the street.
The Harroun Family Barn was built by David and Clarissa Harroun in 1858. The Harrouns and their son Edwin aided slaves along the Underground Railroad, transporting them from Maumee, Ohio in David's lumber wagon and hiding them in their basement, before they made their way into Michigan. The Harroun property was connected to the Lathrop house via a ravine that ran between them; much of the ravine still exists and the road that runs along it is named Ravine Road.

 The Sylvania Historical Village is an open-air museum in downtown Sylvania, that features both original and reproductions of historical buildings in the city, including the original railroad depot that operated in the area for over 100 years, and an original 1800s log home.

Fossil Park is a notable attraction that opened in 2001. Visitors can break apart loose shale from a nearby quarry, which often contain fossil specimens such as trilobites. It is one of two locations in the world where visitors without any paleontological experience are allowed to search for fossils themselves.
The Burnham Building, originally Burnham High School, built in 1927, served as an area high school until the final class graduated in 1960. It was then used as a multipurpose facility until 2010, when it was demolished to make way for the new Maplewood Elementary School.

Parks and recreation

The city is home to over 250 acres of parkland, which include Olander Park, Harroun Community Park, Pacesetter Park, Veterans Memorial Park, and Burnham Park. The Olander Park System ("TOPS") has a large 28 acre pond as well as other satellite parks (Fossil Park, Sylvan Prairie Park, Whetstone Park and Southview Oak Savanna). Pacesetter Park has lacrosse, soccer, and baseball fields, and Burnham Park contains Plummer Pool, a public swimming pool.

Many of Sylvania's recreational activities are organized by the Sylvania Area Joint Recreation Department (SAJRD). They operate multiple facilities and parks, including Pacesetter, Veterans Memorial and Burnham parks, as well as a recreation center, Tam-O-Shanter, with two ice skating rinks and two indoor soccer fields. The center offers indoor sports such as soccer, baseball, lacrosse, ice hockey, and ice skating.

The city has received the "Tree City" designation from the Tree City USA program for over 30 years, which recognizes communities for urban and community forestry. The nickname of the city is the literal translation of its name, "City of Trees".

In 2016, a steel beam from the World Trade Center was installed in the "9/11 First Responders Last Call Memorial" at the Toledo Memorial Park cemetery in Sylvania.

Demographics

2010 census
As of the census of 2010, there were 18,971 people, 7,642 households, and 5,092 families residing in the city. The racial makeup of the city was 92.4% White, 2.7% African American, 0.1% Native American, 2.3% Asian, 0.1% Pacific Islander, 0.7% from other races, and 1.7% from two or more races. Hispanic or Latino of any race were 2.9% of the population.

There were 7,642 households, of which 31.3% had children under the age of 18 living with them, 53.0% were married couples living together, 10.1% had a female householder with no husband present, 3.5% had a male householder with no wife present, and 33.4% were non-families. 28.7% of all households were made up of individuals, and 12.8% had someone living alone who was 65 years of age or older. The average household size was 2.43 and the average family size was 3.02.

The median age in the city was 42.7 years. 23.6% of residents were under the age of 18; 7.8% were between the ages of 18 and 24; 21.5% were from 25 to 44; 29.9% were from 45 to 64; and 17.2% were 65 years of age or older. The gender makeup of the city was 47.3% male and 52.7% female.

2000 census

As of the census of 2000, there were 18,670 people, 7,151 households, and 5,070 families residing in the city. The population density was 3,223.2 people per square mile (1,245.0/km2). There were 7,392 housing units at an average density of 1,276.2 per square mile (492.9/km2). The racial makeup of the city was 95.20% White, 1.00% African American, 0.10% Native American, 2.10% Asian, 0.01% Pacific Islander, 0.64% from other races, and 0.96% from two or more races. Hispanic or Latino of any race were 1.63% of the population. The city has a significant Jewish community.

There were 7,151 households, out of which 37.2% had children under the age of 18 living with them, 59.8% were married couples living together, 8.7% had a female householder with no husband present, and 29.1% were non-families. 25.7% of all households were made up of individuals, and 11.2% had someone living alone who was 65 years of age or older. The average household size was 2.59 and the average family size was 3.16.

In the city, the population was spread out, with 28.2% under the age of 18, 6.7% from 18 to 24, 26.7% from 25 to 44, 25.0% from 45 to 64, and 13.3% who were 65 years of age or older. The median age was 38 years. For every 100 females, there were 90.7 males. For every 100 females age 18 and over, there were 86.6 males.

The median income for a household in the city was $57,358, and the median income for a family was $73,947. Males had a median income of $52,892 versus $34,583 for females. The per capita income for the city was $28,163. About 3.7% of families and 4.2% of the population were below the poverty line, including 4.2% of those under age 18 and 3.9% of those age 65 or over.

Government 

The City of Sylvania follows a mayor–council government. The mayor of Sylvania is Craig Stough. The charter and laws of the City of Sylvania are documented in the Codified Ordinances of the City of Sylvania, Ohio. The judicial branch of the city government is run by the Sylvania Municipal Court, which is presided over by the Honorable Judge Michael A. Bonfiglio.

City Council 
The city council has seven members, comprising eight committees (Building & Grounds, Employee & Community Relations, Finance, Parks & Forestry, Safety, Streets, Utilities & Environment, and Zoning & Annexation):

 Mark Frye
Committees: Streets (chairperson), Finance, Safety, Utilities & Environment and Buildings & Grounds
Patrick Richardson
Committees: Employee and Community Relations (chairperson), Buildings & Grounds, Finance, Streets and Utilities & Environment
Katie Cappellini
Committees: Parks and Forestry (chairperson), Zoning & Annexation, Buildings and Grounds, Employee & Community Relations and Utilities & Environment
Douglas Haynam
Committees: Zoning & Annexation (chairperson), Parks & Forestry, Streets, Employee & Community Relations and Finance
Brian McCann
Committees: Utilities & Environment (chairperson); Safety; Parks & Forestry; Employee & Community Relations and its Economic Development Sub-committee
Lyndsey Stough
Committees: Buildings & Grounds (chairperson), Parks & Forestry, Safety, and Zoning & Annexation
Mary Westphal (Council President)
Committees: Finance (chairperson), Safety (chairperson), Zoning and Annexation

Education

Public
Public schools in Sylvania, Ohio are all part of the Sylvania City School District.

Elementary schools
 Highland Elementary School
 Hill View Elementary School
 Maplewood Elementary School
 Stranahan Elementary School
 Sylvan Elementary School
 Whiteford Elementary School
 Central Trail Elementary School

Junior high schools
 Arbor Hills Junior High School
 McCord Junior High School
 Timberstone Junior High School

High schools
 Sylvania Northview High School
 Sylvania Southview High School

Private
Toledo Islamic Academy
 Little Miracles Montessori School
 St. Joseph Elementary & Junior High School

Colleges
 Lourdes University

Libraries 
Sylvania has two public libraries, one near each high school, which are branches of the Toledo-Lucas County Public Library. The Sylvania Branch Library, located near Northview High School, was built in the 1950s, and was expanded and remodeled in 2017. A second library at King Road near Southview High School was built in 2016.

Sister city
Sylvania is the sister city of Woodstock, Ontario, Canada.

Notable people
 Sam Abell - photographer
 Mark Berger - economist
 Terry Cook - automobile racing driver
 Alissa Czisny - two-time U.S. champion figure skater
 Chip Davis - musician
 Jon Diebler (born 1988) - basketball player in the Israel Basketball Premier League
 Gordie Howe - hockey player
 Eric Kripke - television producer and writer
 Mitchell Miller - hockey player
 Luke Fortner - Offensive Lineman for the Jacksonville Jaguars

Notable events
 Marathon Classic, an LPGA Tour event that has been played in Sylvania since 1989.

References

Bibliography

External links
 Official website
 Sylvania Chamber of Commerce

Cities in Lucas County, Ohio
Populated places established in 1833
1833 establishments in Ohio
Cities in Ohio